William Miller (born March 12, 1947) is an American rower. He competed in the men's coxless four event at the 1972 Summer Olympics.

References

1947 births
Living people
American male rowers
Olympic rowers of the United States
Rowers at the 1972 Summer Olympics
Sportspeople from Brockton, Massachusetts
Pan American Games medalists in rowing
Pan American Games bronze medalists for the United States
Rowers at the 1971 Pan American Games